

Season summary
Robert Ames, later a CIA official killed in the 1983 bombing of the United States embassy in Beirut, Lebanon, was a member of the 1954-55 Explorers.

NCAA tournament
East
 La Salle 95, West Virginia 61
 La Salle 73, Princeton 46
 La Salle 99, Canisius College 64
Final Four
 La Salle 76, Iowa 73
 San Francisco 77, La Salle 63

Rankings

Awards and honors

Team players drafted into the NBA

References

La Salle Explorers men's basketball seasons
NCAA Division I men's basketball tournament Final Four seasons
La Salle Explorers
La Salle
La Salle
La Salle